Gerald Ford (1913–2006) was the president of the United States from 1974 to 1977.

Gerald, Gerry, or Jerry Ford may also refer to:

 Gerald Rudolff Ford (1890–1962), namesake stepfather of the 38th president
 USS Gerald R. Ford, a 2013 supercarrier named for the 38th president
 Gerald R. Ford-class aircraft carrier, named for the lead ship
 Gerald J. Ford (born 1944), banker
 Gerald J. Ford Stadium
 Gerard W. Ford (1924–2008), American businessman who started Ford Modelling Agency
Gerry Ford (businessman) (born 1957), American businessman, founder of Caffè Nero
Jerry Ford Invitational, a celebrity pro-am golf tournament run from 1977 to 1996

See also
 Presidency of Gerald Ford
 Gerald R. Ford International Airport, Grand Rapids, Michigan
 Gerald R. Ford School of Public Policy, University of Michigan
 Gerald R. Ford Presidential Library, University of Michigan
 Gerald R. Ford Presidential Museum, Grand Rapids, Michigan
 President Gerald R. Ford, Jr. Boyhood Home